Albert François Lebrun (29 August 1871 – 6 March 1950) was a French politician, President of France from 1932 to 1940. He was the last president of the Third Republic. He was a member of the centre-right Democratic Republican Alliance (ARD).

Biography

Early life
Born to a farming family in Mercy-le-Haut, Meurthe-et-Moselle, he attended the École Polytechnique and the École des Mines de Paris, graduating from both at the top of his class. He then became a mining engineer in Vesoul and Nancy, but left that profession at the age of 29 to enter politics.

Politics
Lebrun gained a seat in the Chamber of Deputies in 1900 as a member of the Left Republican Party, later serving on the cabinet as Minister for the Colonies from 1912–1914, Minister of War in 1913 and Minister for Liberated Regions, 1917–1919.  Joining the Democratic Alliance, he was elected to the French senate from Meurthe-et-Moselle in 1920, and served as Vice President of the Senate from 1925 through 1929. He was president of that body from 1931–1932.

President
Lebrun was elected President of France by the newly elected Chamber of Deputies following the assassination of President Paul Doumer by Pavel Gurgulov on 6 May 1932. Re-elected in 1939, largely because of his record of accommodating all political sides, he exercised little power as President.

In June 1940, with the military collapse of France imminent, Lebrun wrote "the uselessness of the struggle was demonstrated. An end must be made." With the Cabinet wanting to ask for an armistice, on 17 June 1940 Prime Minister Paul Reynaud resigned, recommending to President Lebrun that he appoint Marechal Philippe Petain in his place, which he did that day. British General Sir Edward Spears, who was present with the French cabinet during this crisis wrote "it is clear that the President had made up his mind that France was free of her obligations to Britain, and was at liberty to ask for an armistice [with Germany] if she deemed it to be in her interests to do so."

On 10 July 1940, Lebrun enacted the Constitutional Law of 10 July 1940, which the National Assembly had voted for by 569 votes to 80, allowing Prime Minister Philippe Pétain to promulgate a new constitution. On 11 July, Lebrun was replaced by Pétain as head of state.

Lebrun then fled to Vizille (Isère) on 15 July, but was later captured, on 27 August 1943, when the Germans moved into the region and was sent into captivity at the Itter Castle in Tyrol. On 10 October 1943 he was allowed to return to Vizille due to illness, but was kept under constant surveillance.

On 11 October 1944, Lebrun met with Charles de Gaulle and acknowledged the General's leadership, and conveniently forgetting the new Constitutional Law he had enacted in 1940, said that he had not formally resigned as President because the dissolution of the National Assembly had left nobody to accept his resignation.  Whether or not de Gaulle accepted this lie is unknown. During the post-war Petain trial "all the available celebrities of the Third Republic testified, including Lebrun, all whitewashing themselves". Lebrun argued again that he had never officially resigned. De Gaulle made no mystery of his low opinion of Lebrun, and wrote about him in his memoirs "As a head of state he lacked two things: there was no state, and he wasn't a head."

Personal life
Lebrun was married to Marguerite Lebrun (née Nivoit). Together they had two children: a son Jean and a daughter Marie.

Later life
After the war, Lebrun lived in retirement. He died of pneumonia in Paris on 6 March 1950 after a protracted illness.

References

External links
 
 

|-

|-

|-

|-

|-

1871 births
1950 deaths
20th-century presidents of France
20th-century Princes of Andorra
People from Meurthe-et-Moselle
French Roman Catholics
Politicians from Grand Est
Progressive Republicans (France)
Democratic Republican Alliance politicians
French Ministers of Overseas France
French Ministers of Liberated Regions
French Ministers of War
Government ministers of France
Members of the 7th Chamber of Deputies of the French Third Republic
Members of the 8th Chamber of Deputies of the French Third Republic
Members of the 9th Chamber of Deputies of the French Third Republic
Members of the 10th Chamber of Deputies of the French Third Republic
Members of the 11th Chamber of Deputies of the French Third Republic
Members of the 12th Chamber of Deputies of the French Third Republic
French Senators of the Third Republic
Senators of Meurthe-et-Moselle
Presidents of the Senate (France)
French people of World War I
French people of World War II
World War II political leaders
École Polytechnique alumni
Mines Paris - PSL alumni
Corps des mines
Deaths from pneumonia in France
Recipients of the Order of the White Eagle (Poland)
Grand Crosses of the Order of Saint-Charles
Commanders Grand Cross of the Order of the Polar Star